The Haut de Cry is a mountain of the Bernese Alps, overlooking the Rhône Valley in the canton of Valais. It is composed of several summits, of which the highest has an elevation of 2,969 metres above sea level. The entire mountain lies within the basin of the Rhône, which flows approximately seven kilometres to the south.

The nearest localities are Derborence and Ardon, on the east side of the Haut de Cry.

References

External links

Haut de Cry on Summitpost
Haut de Cry on Hikr

Mountains of the Alps
Mountains of Switzerland
Mountains of Valais
Two-thousanders of Switzerland